Carl-Henrik "Kenne" Fant (1 January 1923 – 29 May 2016) was a Swedish actor, director, and writer.

Early life
Kenne Fant was born in Strängnäs to Captain Tore Fant and Stina Fant (née Gustafsson). He was the younger brother of  actor, director, and writer George Fant and first cousin of speech scientist Gunnar Fant.

Career
Fant studied at Dramatens elevskola from 1945 to 1949, and was at the Royal Dramatic Theatre from 1949 - 1950. He was hired as director of the Nordisk Tonefilm 1952 -1962, and became production manager of Swedish Film Industry (SF) in 1962. He was appointed CEO of SF from 1963. In 1980 he resigned to become a freelance writer. His 1962 film Adventures of Nils Holgersson was entered into the 3rd Moscow International Film Festival. In 1991, he published a biography of Alfred Nobel that included many references to the extensive collection of Nobel's letters.

Fant was appointed in 2005 an honorary doctorate in History and Philosophy of Science at Uppsala University.

Monismanien Prize
In 1975, Fant established the Monismanien Prize for freedom of speech.

Selected filmography

Actor
 Youth in Danger (1946)
 Life in the Finnish Woods (1947)
 The Poetry of Ådalen (1947)
 The People of Simlang Valley (1947)
 The Loveliest Thing on Earth (1947) as Göran Thome
 Each Heart Has Its Own Story (1948)
 Prison (1949) as Arne
 The Swedish Horseman (1949)
 Poker (1951)
 In Lilac Time (1952)
 Kalle Karlsson of Jularbo (1952)
 The Girl from Backafall (1953)
 All the World's Delights (1953)
 Dance, My Doll (1953)
 The Road to Klockrike (1953)
 The Beat of Wings in the Night (1953)

Director
 The Beat of Wings in the Night (1953)
 The Shadow (1953)
 Young Summer (1954)
 Tarps Elin (1956)
 The Minister of Uddarbo (1957)
 The Wedding Day (1960)
 Adventures of Nils Holgersson (1962)

References

External links

1923 births
2016 deaths
Swedish male film actors
Swedish film directors
Swedish male writers